Quiroga is a comarca in the Galician Province of Lugo, Spain. The overall population of this local region is 6,800 (2005).

Municipalities

Folgoso do Courel, Quiroga and Ribas de Sil.

Quiroga